Trondheimsk, Trondheim dialect or Trondheim Norwegian is a dialect of Norwegian used in Trondheim. It is a variety of Trøndersk.

Phonology

Consonants
  is dental .
 After short vowels, it is realized as an approximant, either palatal  or palatalized dental .
 When it occurs after a short vowel before a voiceless stop (particularly ), it is realized as a voiceless dental lateral continuant, described variously as an approximant  and a fricative .
  tends to be realized as a voiced retroflex fricative .

Vowels
 The schwa  does not exist in the Trondheim dialect.
  have the most open realization in all of Norway, i.e. open front .
  are fully back .
  has a back starting point .

Tonemes

Phonetic realization
The tonemes of the Trondheim dialect are the same as those of the Oslo dialect; accent 1 is low-rising, whereas accent 2 is falling-rising.

References

Bibliography

 
 
 

Norwegian dialects
Culture in Trondheim
City colloquials